Emma Booth is an Australian model and actress from Perth, Western Australia. The former teen model and TV actress played a significant role in the 2007 film Clubland.

TV and film career
After Clubland was screened at the Sundance Film Festival, many talent agencies solicited Booth for roles in upcoming films.

Booth appeared in the 2009 horror film Blood Creek, directed by Joel Schumacher. She worked on the unreleased 2007 production Hippie Hippie Shake, an account of the Schoolkids OZ obscenity trials in the United Kingdom. Since 2009, Booth has appeared in Underbelly: The Golden Mile and had a supporting role in the 2013 Parker. In 2017, she appeared in Hounds of Love, as the partner of a serial killer.

In July 2017, Booth joined the hit ABC series Once Upon A Time in a recurring role for its rebooted season seven. She played the main antagonist, Mother Gothel, a powerful witch who is the leader of the Coven of the Eight.

Modelling career
At thirteen, Booth was cast in The Adventures of the Bush Patrol, and at fourteen became a finalist in Girlfriend magazine's cover girl competition. By fifteen, Booth had modelled in Tokyo, Milan, Paris and New York. She later held the title of Western Australia's Model of the Year and Face of Fashion Week, for Sydney and Melbourne.

Personal life
In March 2015, Booth stated on Instagram that she had married musician Dominick Joseph Luna in 2013 in Las Vegas, Nevada.

Filmography

Film

Television

References

External links

Australian film actresses
Australian television actresses
Actresses from Perth, Western Australia
Living people
Female models from Western Australia
Models from Perth, Western Australia
1982 births
People from Denmark, Western Australia
Best Actress AACTA Award winners
Best Supporting Actress AACTA Award winners
21st-century Australian actresses